Nancy Isime (born 17 December 1991) is a Nigerian actress, model, and media personality.

Early life and background
Nancy Isime was born in Edo State, Nigeria to Nigerian parents of Esan descent. After her senior secondary education in Benin, she went on to obtain a diploma at the University of Lagos.

Nancy Isime lost her mother at age five and was raised by her father. She grew up in Lagos, where she had her primary and junior secondary education. Afterward, she left for Benin City, where she had her senior secondary education. She did a six-month basic course at the University of Port Harcourt before obtaining a diploma in Social Work at the University of Lagos.

Career
Nancy Isime began a career as an actress in the TV series Echoes in 2011. She is also a television presenter, known for presenting gossip show The Squeeze, technology show What's Hot, and backstage segments of MTN Project Fame season 7. In 2016 she replaced Toke Makinwa as the presenter of the popular show Trending on HipTV. She co-hosted the 2019 edition of The Headies award with Reminisce. She is also the presenter of The Voice Nigeria 2021. In 2019, Isime launched her own TV show which she called The Nancy Isime Show. In 2020, she co-hosted The Headies award with Bovi. In 2022, she starred in the Netflix original series Blood Sisters, playing the lead role of Kemi, produced by Ebonylife TV studio which is owned by Mo Abudu. In 2023, she starred as Shalewa in Shanty Town which caused abuzz on social media.

Filmography

 The Set Up 2 (2022)
 Obara'm (2022)
 Shanty Town (2023)

Awards and recognition

References

External links 

 

Nigerian television actresses
Nigerian television presenters
Nigerian female models
Living people
1991 births
University of Lagos alumni
People from Edo State
Nigerian women television presenters
Nigerian media personalities
Nigerian film actresses
Nigerian film award winners